The Norm was a CBC Radio comedy show that ran between 1986 and 1988. It was the immediate successor to The Frantics' Frantic Times radio show, whose slot they took over in January 1986, and tried to capitalize on its often surreal and zany style with its own cast of characters placed in odd situations.

Its regular cast consisted of Peter McCowatt,  Megan Smith, Brian Moffatt and Eva Almos. It was wholly recorded in the studio for its first season, and moved to live stage recordings for its second.
Re-occurring characters including Sammy Silverfish (a bug who got squished at the end of every segment), Galley George ("one sensitive man against the scourge of history's philistines, armed only with a bounteous knowledge of fine cuisine"), and the always obtuse "Norm Theatre" segments.

The Norm had higher ratings than its predecessor in its time slot, but was cancelled anyway. The creators McCowatt and Moffatt were not officially informed but found out when they called their producer David Milligan (same producer for Frantics) to discuss their newest scripts. Insiders claim CBC just couldn't relate to humour that didn't rely solely on Canadian political satire. McCowatt once said "Humor is truth extracted from all of life's bullshit. Since there is no truth in politics, the only thing political humour leaves you with is bullshit."
The Norm was succeeded by the politically satirical show Double Exposure.

Its distinctive theme music was the Trio song "Hearts are Trump".

Peter McCowatt's comedy writing and performance can be heard today in the critical charged Stan Noble Presents...Comedy for Short Attention Spans which airs on XM Radio's Laugh Attack 153. McCowatt co-created this program with Jamie Watson, Tom Goudie and several other top Canadian performers.

CBC Radio One programs
Canadian radio sketch shows
1986 radio programme debuts
1988 radio programme endings
Surreal comedy radio series